Yannic Lerjen (born July 26, 1990 in Täsch) is a Swiss freestyle skier, specializing in halfpipe and slopestyle.

Lerjen competed at the 2014 Winter Olympics for Switzerland. He placed 14th in the qualifying round in the halfpipe, failing to advance.

Lerjen made his World Cup debut in January 2011. As of April 2014, his best World Cup finish is 4th, at Calgary in 2013–14. His best World Cup overall finish in a discipline is 8th, in the 2013–14 halfpipe.

References

1990 births
Living people
Olympic freestyle skiers of Switzerland
Freestyle skiers at the 2014 Winter Olympics
People from Visp (district)
Swiss male freestyle skiers
Sportspeople from Valais
21st-century Swiss people